The 2016 Philippine Superliga Beach Volleyball Challenge Cup was the second tournament of the Philippine Superliga for its fourth season. The conference ran from May 7 to 29, 2016 at The Sands, SM By The Bay (SM Mall of Asia).

Women's division

NOTE: Withdrew during Day 1 of the tournament.

Preliminary round

Pool A

|}

|}

Pool B

|}

|}

Pool C

|}

|}
NOTE: Winner by default. MIT withdrew from the tournament.

Pool D

|}

|}

Playoffs

Quarterfinals

|}

|}

For 7th place

|}

For 5th place

|}

Semi-finals

|}

For 3rd place

|}

Women's Finals

|}

Final standing

Men's division

Preliminary round

Pool A

|}

|}

Pool B

|}

|}

Playoffs

Semi-finals

|}

For 3rd place

|}

Men's Finals

|}

Final standing

Venue
 The Sands (SM By The Bay, SM Mall of Asia)

Broadcast partners
 TV5, AksyonTV, Sports5.ph

References

Philippine Super Liga
Beach volleyball competitions in the Philippines
PSL
PSL